Paraulax queulensis is a species of gall wasp. Biology of Paraulax species is unknown but given they are associated with Nothofagus forests their biology is probably associated with the pteromalid gall community. This species is named after the place where it was first collected, Los Queules National Reserve. P. queulensis closely resembles P. perplexa, bearing common traits such as colour, habitus and several morphological characters. P. queulensis differs by having a more elongate body, which in the female is 4 times longer than it is high; its mesosoma is 1.6 times longer than high, while its metasoma is 1.9 times longer than high. The mesosoma is more dorsoventrally depressed. Its pronotum s 1.5 times longer laterally than high. It possesses longitudinal costulae running from the lateral margin of its pronotal plate to its lateral surface. Its scutellar foveae is discernible even when shallow (Fig. 4C). The antenna also differs: the pedicel of the female antenna is 1.4 times longer than wide.

Description
The colour of its body, as well as coxae and the first two antennomeres in both sexes are black; the antennal flagellum, tarsi, pro and mesotibia as well as the apex of its femora are dark brown. Its forewing is hyaline, its veins brown.

Female
The head is oval, being 1.9 times wider than long, with a gena expanded behind its compound eye. Its face has sparse setation, which is denser in the lower face; a vertical median carina is absent. Its frons and vertex counts with a shining coriaceous sculpture. Its clypeus is indistinct and rectangular, the ventral margin of which slightly projects over its mandibles.

The antenna is 0.6 times the length of the body, with 12 antennomeres, its flagellum widened towards its apex. Placodeal sensilla are visible only on flagellar segments F7 through F10; pedicel 1.4 times longer than wide. The apical flagellomere is spindle-shaped, 3 times longer than wide. The pronotum is strongly pubescent laterally. The lateral surface of the pronotum is coriaceous, with strong, long rugae running horizontally from the lateral margin of the pronotal plate, reaching the posterior margin of the pronotum. The mesoscutum is as wide as long. Its notauli are percurrent, straight and narrow, converging posteriorly. The mesopleuron counts with a marked longitudinal impression. The mesopleural triangle is rhomboidal and densely pubescent. Its metascutellum is distinctly constricted in its median area. A dorsal nucha is present with strong, irregular longitudinal rugae.

The animal's profemur shows a ventral swelling in its basal third, with 4–5 rows of sharp and deep costulae. It also shows metatarsal claws with a basal acute lobe or tooth. Its forewing is somewhat longer than its body. An areolet is absent, while there is a fringe of long setae along the apical margin of the wing. The metasoma is slightly shorter than the sum of the head plus mesosoma. The abdominal petiole is dorsally smooth, with deep longitudinal grooves ventrally. The projecting part of the hypopygial spine is 4 times longer than it is high. The subapical setae are longer than the apical setae, forming a small tuft.

Male
The male of this species is similar to the female except for the following characteristics: its antenna counts with 15 antennomeres. The flagellum is not widened towards the apex, the outer apical margin of the flagellum being straight; approximately 2.5 times longer than the pedicel. Placodeal sensillae are present on all flagellomeres except F1, arranged in a single row of 4–5 sensillae on each structure.

Distribution
It is known from Talca, Chile, up to Villarrica, being associated to Nothofagus obliqua forests, as is the case with P. perplexa. It is associated with galls induced by Espinosa species on N. obliqua. It has a flight period during late winter and early spring, similar to P. perplexa as well.

References

Further reading
Medianero, Enrique, Héctor Barrios, and José Luis Nieves-Aldrey. "Gall-Inducing Insects and Their Associated Parasitoid Assemblages in the Forests of Panama." Neotropical Insect Galls. Springer Netherlands, 2014. 465–496.

Cynipidae
Insects described in 2009
Gall-inducing insects
Endemic fauna of Chile